If Four Walls Told is a 1923 British silent drama film directed by Fred Paul and starring Lillian Hall-Davis, Fred Paul and Campbell Gullan. It was based on a play by Edward Percy.

Cast
 Lillian Hall-Davis - Martha Tregoning 
 Fred Paul - Jan Rysling / Tom 
 Campbell Gullan - David Rysling 
 John Stuart - Ned Mason 
 Minna Grey - Elizabeth Rysling 
 Enid King - Clare Sturgis 
 Polly Emery - Mrs. Sturgis 
 Somers Bellamy - Toby Crouch

References

Bibliography
 Low, Rachael. The History of British Film, Volume 4 1918-1929. Routledge, 1997.

External links

1923 films
British silent feature films
British drama films
1920s English-language films
Films directed by Fred Paul
Films produced by G. B. Samuelson
British black-and-white films
1923 drama films
1920s British films
Silent drama films